Harry Walker (1918–1999) was an American baseball player, manager and coach.

Harry Walker may also refer to:
Harry C. Walker (1873–1932), Lieutenant Governor of New York
Harry G. R. Walker, former mayor of Regina, Saskatchewan, Canada
Harry Walker (cricketer) (1760–1805), English cricketer
Harry Walker (footballer) (1916–1976), English football goalkeeper
Harry G. Walker (1892–1982), Australian rules footballer
Harry Walker (politician) (1873–1950), company director and member of the Queensland Legislative Assembly
Harry Walker (rugby union) (1915–2018), English rugby union player
Harry Walker: pseudonym used by Hillary Waugh (1920–2008), American mystery novelist

See also
Henry Walker (disambiguation)
Harold Walker (disambiguation)